The Pat Hobby Stories are a collection of 17 short stories written by F. Scott Fitzgerald, first published by Arnold Gingrich of Esquire magazine between January 1940 and May 1941, and later collected in one volume in 1962. The last five installments in Esquire of The Pat Hobby Stories were published posthumously; Fitzgerald died on December 21, 1940.

Pat Hobby is a down-and-out screenwriter in Hollywood, once successful as "a good man for structure" during the silent age of cinema, but now reduced to an alcoholic hack hanging around the studio lot. Most stories find him broke and engaged in some ploy for money or a much-desired screen credit, but his antics usually backfire and end in further humiliation.

Drawing on his own experiences as a writer in Hollywood, Fitzgerald portrays Pat Hobby with self-deprecating humor and nostalgia.

Arnold Gingrich, in an introduction to The Pat Hobby Stories, notes how, "while it would be unfair to judge this book as a novel, it would be less than fair to consider it as anything but a full-length portrait. It was as such that Fitzgerald worked on it, and would have wanted it presented in book form, after its original magazine publication. He thought of it as a comedy."

List of stories

Screen adaptation
A television adaptation of the Pat Hobby Stories was made in 1987, titled Tales from the Hollywood Hills: Pat Hobby Teamed with Genius, starring Christopher Lloyd as Pat Hobby and directed by Robert C. Thompson. The cast also included Colin Firth as Rene Wilcox, Joseph Campanella as Jack Berners, and Dennis Franz as Louie.

Quotations

"Pat was forty-nine. He was a writer but he had never written much, nor even read all the 'originals' he worked from, because it made his head bang to read much. But the good old silent days you got somebody's plot and a smart secretary and gulped benzedrine 'structure' at her six or eight hours every week. The director took care of the gags. After talkies came he always teamed up with some man who wrote dialogue. Some young man who liked to work." (From "A Man in the Way".)
"...for an old-timer like Pat, what people you sat with at lunch was more important in getting along than what you dictated in your office. This was no art, as he often said - this was an industry." (From "'Boil Some Water - Lots of It'".)
" 'Mr. Marcus,' he said so sincerely that his voice trembled, 'I wouldn't be surprised if Orson Welles is the biggest menace that's come to Hollywood for years. He gets a hundred and fifty grand a picture and I wouldn't be surprised if he was so radical that you had to have all new equipment and start all over again like you did with sound in 1928.' " (From "Pat Hobby and Orson Welles".)
"Most writers look like writers whether they want to or not. It is hard to say why - for they model their exteriors whimsically on Wall Street brokers, cattle kings or English explorers - but they all turn out looking like writers, as definitely typed as 'The Public' or 'The Profiteers' in the cartoons." (From "Pat Hobby, Putative Father".)
"Pat was at 'the end of his resources' - though this term is too ominous to describe a fairly usual condition in his life. He was an old timer in pictures; he had once known sumptuous living, but for the past ten years jobs had been hard to hold - harder to hold than glasses." (From "No Harm Trying".)

Reviews

Essays
"Introduction by Arnold Gingrich" in The Pat Hobby Stories by F. Scott Fitzgerald.

References and notes

External links
Esquire magazine Cover Gallery
Online text of The Complete Pat Hobby Stories at Project Gutenberg
Tales from the Hollywood Hills: Pat Hobby Teamed with Genius at the Internet Movie Database
Three short radio scripts from Pat Hobby stories at California Legacy Project.

1962 short story collections
Short story collections by F. Scott Fitzgerald
Los Angeles in fiction
American short story collections
Hollywood novels